The Namibia National Labour Organisation (NANLO) is one of three national trade union centres in Namibia. NANLO was established in 2014 by Evilastus Kaaronda.  Kaaronda was dismissed as general secretary of the National Union of Namibian Workers (NUNW), the national centre aligned to SWAPO, the country's ruling party, in 2012 for campaigning against government corruption.

Affiliates
NANLO has three affiliated unions:
 The Metal, Mining, Maritime and Construction Union (MMMC)
 The Namibia Parastatals and Civil Service Workers Union (NPCWU)
 Solidarity Union (SU) - organises commercial, retail, tourism sectors.

See also
 National Union of Namibian Workers (NUNW)
 Trade Union Congress of Namibia (TUCNA)

References

Trade unions in Namibia
2014 establishments in Namibia
Trade unions established in 2014